Þórdís Árnadóttir (19 September 1933 – 6 November 2013) was an Icelandic swimmer. She competed in the women's 200 metre breaststroke at the 1948 Summer Olympics.

References

External links
 

1933 births
2013 deaths
Þórdís Árnadóttir
Þórdís Árnadóttir
Swimmers at the 1948 Summer Olympics
Place of birth missing